is a Japanese singer. In addition to his solo work, he is a vocalist, lyricist and composer in the music duo After the Rain formed with fellow utaite singer Soraru. His broad vocal range, spanning well over five octaves, allows him to sing in a high register comparable to some Vocaloid songs; with some covers, he has also adopted the name  for his "female persona", who has an even higher voice. His image color is white. His 2D image has a signature appearance of white hair and a barcode on his left cheek. His youtube channel has over 3 million subscribers. His videos have over 2.0 billion combined views.

Mafumafu plays guitar and piano. He covers Vocaloid songs from other creators as well as performing his own original songs. He also produces music for games, anime, and other artists.

On 5 June 2022, Mafumafu announced on Twitter that after his solo live concerts on 11 and 12 June in the Tokyo Dome, he would go on an indefinite hiatus from all personal musical activities as Mafumafu for the first time in 11 years, citing his medical condition. He will remain active as a musician to produce music for other artists, as well as continue to participate in group collaborations.

Early life 
Mafumafu had piano lessons when he was younger. When he was in elementary school, he tried to make ring tones with an app on a mobile phone his father gave him. He later decided that music was his vocation when he was in high school. In university, he formed a rock band with his friends, the guitarist in the band introduced him to the culture of vocaloid songs and Utaites on the internet. This inspired him to upload his songs on the internet.

Music career 
He began publishing song cover videos on Niconico in late 2010. In interviews, he has said that he enjoys listening to a variety of music including electronic, and that he was drawn to music because his childhood was painful and he felt he could convey in music the emotions he had difficulty expressing otherwise. He also believes he grows when he is able to overcome the things he did not know or was unable to do before. Since his life in the music industry began, he has stored vocabulary and experiences within himself, which he pulls on when composing and writing lyrics.

While Mafumafu primarily works on his solo dōjin albums, he has done two albums with utaite singer Soraru. On 13 April 2016, they released Crocrest Story under the name After the Rain under the Universal Entertainment Japan label. Mafumafu handled most of the composition and arrangement for the album. He said that he tried to create songs that matched both of their musical ranges, was fun for them, and that drew out both of their strengths. The album reached second place on Oricon's weekly charts.

His first solo tour ran from 15 January to 5 February 2017. On 7 May, Mafumafu hosted Hikikomori-tachi demo Fest ga shitai! (ひきこもりたちでもフェスがしたい！) and performed alongside Soraru, Amatsuki, Urashimasakatasen, luz, un:c, Araki, nqrse, and kradness. On 18 October 2017, he released the album titled Ashita-iro World end (明日色ワールドエンド), an album which looks at the end of the world.

Connected to Disney, an official Disney cover album, was released on 13 March 2019. Mafumafu helped produce the album, as well as performed alongside six other singers. On 22 June 2019, he held a solo live performance at the MetLife Dome with an audience of 35,000 people. On the next day, 23 March, Mafumafu hosted the annual Hikikomori-tachi demo Fest ga shitai! (ひきこもりたちでもフェスがしたい！). In July, Mafumafu released the single Sacrifice (サクリファイス). This was his first time creating music for an anime, this time for the anime To the Abandoned Sacred Beasts. His album titled Kagura-iro Artifact (神楽色アーティファクト) was released through A-Sketch Inc. on 16 October. There were 20 songs in the album, more than any other album Mafumafu had previously released. He attempted to select the best 20 songs he was capable of creating and included songs with a variety of musical styles, which was a different trend from previous albums.  Mafumafu also wrote the lyrics, composed, and arranged the music for the opening theme of Pokémon Journeys, scheduled to first air on 17 November 2019, on TV Tokyo. The opening theme "One, Two, Three" is sung by After the Rain, Mafumafu and Soraru's music duo, for the first 31 episodes.

On 16 February 2020, Mafumafu was found unconscious in his living room by staff visiting his home. He was transported to a medical institution, where he was diagnosed with cardiogenic syncope.

Mafumafu was scheduled to hold a solo show at the Tokyo Dome on 25 March 2020 as well as his Hikikomori-tachi demo Fest ga shitai! (ひきこもりたちでもフェスがしたい！) in the Tokyo Dome on 26 March. However, he announced on 12 March that he would hold off on the performances due to the impacts of COVID-19. While he did consider postponing the events to a later date, it was officially announced on 31 March that they were canceled.

Sales of Mafumafu's first video release is scheduled to go on sale 14 October 2020, consisting of video shot during his 2019 performance at the MetLife Dome.

Mafumafu continues to be active on both YouTube and Niconico. He has participated in live shows and summer comic market events. He is currently posting videos with fellow utaite singers and friends Soraru, Amatsuki, Uratanuki, Ahono sakata, luz, as well as game commentator Kiyo.

Mafumafu has a Teru teru bōzu character called Mafuteru (まふてる) which acts as his guardian. Mafuteru is sometimes said to help Mafumafu with the illustrations and editing for his music videos.

The internet series Hikikomori demo maru maru ga shitai! (ひきこもりでも○○がしたい!), also known as Hikimaru (ひきまる), started on 19 December 2018, with appearances by Mafumafu. The second season, Hikimaru 2nd, started on 26 September 2019, with a line up of eight people consisting of Mafumafu, Soraru, Amatsuki, luz, Uratanuki, Shima, Tonari no sakata, and Senra.

On 23 October 2021, On the YouTube channel of Haru Shibuya (渋谷ハル), a virtual YouTuber. Soraru, Haru Shibuya announces the establishment of a virtual YouTuber office with the professional gaming team "Crazy Raccoon". It was also announced that they would participate as an operation.

On 19 November 2021, Mafumafu was announced that he would participate in the 72nd NHK Kōhaku Uta Gassen on 31 December of the same year for the first time.

On 5 June 2022, Mafumafu announced on Twitter that after his following live performances on 11 and 12 June, he would go on an indefinite hiatus from all personal musical activities as Mafumafu for the first time in 11 years, citing his medical condition. He still plans to be active as a songwriter for other artists, as well as continue to participate in group collaborations.

Discography

Album

Solo albums 
The highest rank is based on Oricon weekly charts.

Vocaloid original albums

Singles

Other charted songs

Performance

Voice actor 

 2016 – Theater anime Sukininaru sono shunkan wo.~ Kokuhaku jikkō iinkai ~ (The moment love it Confession Executive Committee) role as School boy A
 2017 – TV Anime – Atom: The Beginning Role as Student 2 (EP.4)

TV program 

 19 October 2019 – Hikikomori kara dōmu e netto jidai no senku-sha ma fuma fu on NHK

Internet TV 

 27 January 2018 – Wakeari veggie on AbemaTV Ultra games 
 19 December 2018 – Hikikomori demo maru maru ga shitai! (also known as Hikimaru) on Yahoo! JAPAN

Note

References

External links 

 
 
 
 
 Niconico channel
 Instrumental on dropbox

1991 births
Living people
21st-century Japanese male singers
Japanese male singer-songwriters
Japanese music arrangers
Vocaloid musicians
Utaite
Japanese YouTubers